This is a list of association football clubs located in Costa Rica. For a complete list, see :Category:Football clubs in Costa Rica

Active teams

A
Alajuelense

B
Barrio Mexico
Belen
Brujas F.C.

C
Carmelita
Cartaginés

D
Deportivo Saprissa

H
Herediano

L
Liberia
Limón F.C.
Limonense

O
Orión F.C.

P
Perez Zeledon
Puntarenas F.C.

R
Ramonense

S
San Carlos
Santacruceña
Santos de Guápiles

U
Universidad
Uruguay de Coronado

Defunct Teams

G
Gimnástica de San José

L
Limon FC

External links
Official websites
(FEDEFUTBOL)
(UNAFUT)
(LIASCE)
(LINAFA)

References

Costa Rica
 
Football Clubs
Football clubs